José Luíz Barbosa, known as Zequinha Barbosa (born May 27, 1961) is a Brazilian former middle-distance runner who specialized in the 800 metres. José participated in 4 Olympic Games: 1984 Los Angeles; 1988 Soul Korea; 1992 Barcelona and 1996 Atlanta. He is the 1987 World Indoor Champion, and a two-time World Championship medallist, winning silver in 1991 and bronze in 1987. 1995 Pan American gold medalist 800m 1987 Silver medalist, 1983 Silver medalist 800m and Silver 4x400m. Jose was ranked number one in the world in the 800m in 1991.

Career
Born in Três Lagoas, Mato Grosso do Sul, Barbosa won the silver medal at the 1991 World Championships in Tokyo. A few weeks before, Barbosa had won the 800m race at the prestigious Letzigrund meeting in Zurich. He travelled to Tokyo as the favourite but lost to Billy Konchellah from Kenya, who overtook him on the home straight.

Shortly after the championships, Barbosa ran the fastest time of the year in Rieti, where he clocked 1 minute 43.08 secs. This remained his personal best throughout the remainder of his career. A year later he placed fourth in the Olympic final.

Earlier in his career, Barbosa had won a bronze medal at the 1987 World Championships in Athletics in Rome, and finished sixth in the 800m final at the 1988 Summer Olympics in Seoul.

Barbosa celebrated his greatest indoor success at the 1987 IAAF World Indoor Championships in Indianapolis, where he won gold over 800m. At the 1993 IAAF World Indoor Championships in Toronto he entered the 800m final as a favourite but dropped out after colliding with Nico Motchebon.

Barbosa was head Cross Country and Track and Field Coach at Granite Hills High School in El Cajon for 5 1/2 years.

Barbosa was also the Men's Cross Country and Track and Field coach for Mesa College in San Diego, CA.

On December 1, 2021, he was named the Cross Country and track assistant coach at Bellevue University Nebraska.

Competition record

Personal bests
Outdoor
400 metres – 45.9h (Sǎo Paulo 1983)
800 metres – 1:43.08 (Rieti 1991)
1000 metres – 2:17.36 (Nice 1985)
1500 metres – 3:37.04 (Grosseto 1991)

Indoor
600 metres – 1:16.82 (Karlsruhe 1986)
800 metres – 1:45.43 (Piraeus 1989)
1000 metres – 2:20.77 (Madrid 1989)

References

1961 births
Living people
People from Três Lagoas
Sportspeople from Mato Grosso do Sul
Brazilian male middle-distance runners
Brazilian male sprinters
Olympic male middle-distance runners
Olympic male sprinters
Olympic athletes of Brazil
Athletes (track and field) at the 1984 Summer Olympics
Athletes (track and field) at the 1988 Summer Olympics
Athletes (track and field) at the 1992 Summer Olympics
Athletes (track and field) at the 1996 Summer Olympics
Pan American Games athletes for Brazil
Pan American Games gold medalists for Brazil
Pan American Games medalists in athletics (track and field)
Athletes (track and field) at the 1987 Pan American Games
Athletes (track and field) at the 1983 Pan American Games
Athletes (track and field) at the 1995 Pan American Games
World Athletics Championships athletes for Brazil
World Athletics Championships medalists
Goodwill Games medalists in athletics
World Athletics Indoor Championships winners
World Athletics Indoor Championships medalists
Competitors at the 1990 Goodwill Games
Competitors at the 1994 Goodwill Games
Japan Championships in Athletics winners
Medalists at the 1983 Pan American Games
Medalists at the 1987 Pan American Games
Medalists at the 1995 Pan American Games
20th-century Brazilian people